Eupithecia hollowayi is a moth in the family Geometridae. It is found on Borneo.

The wingspan is about 18 mm. The ground colour of the forewings is dirty white. The basal area is brown along the costa and the medial area is brown from the discal dot to the costal margin. The ground colour of the hindwings is also dirty white, with brown transverse lines.

References

Moths described in 2010
hollowayi
Moths of Asia